Ghost Town is the sixth full-length album by Chicago musician Mike Kinsella under the moniker Owen. It was released on November 8, 2011 to mostly positive reviews.

Track listing

Development
Kinsella has stated in interviews that the album was composed over the course of about two years, with the early drum work beginning while he was on tour with a reunited Cap'n Jazz in 2010. Sources of inspiration for the record included his first experiences as a father, exploring his old home and defending his beliefs.

References

2011 albums
Owen (musician) albums
Polyvinyl Record Co. albums
Albums produced by Brian Deck